The following is a list of international prime ministerial trips made by Imran Khan during his term as the Prime Minister of Pakistan from 2018 to 2022.

Summary of international trips

As of April 2022, Imran Khan had made 34 foreign trips to 16 countries during his Prime Ministership from 18 August 2018 to 10 April 2022.

2018

2019

2020

2021

2022

References

Trips
Pakistani prime ministerial visits
2018 in international relations
2019 in international relations
2020 in international relations
2021 in international relations
2022 in international relations
Diplomacy-related lists
21st century in international relations